Paradiastole (from Greek παραδιαστολή from παρά para "next to, alongside", and διαστολή diastole "separation, distinction") is the reframing of a vice as a virtue, often with the use of euphemism, for example, "Yes, I know it does not work all the time, but that is what makes it interesting." It is often used ironically. 

Paradiastole has been described as "the rhetorical technique of evaluative redescription -- more popularly known as euphemism and dysphemism -- designed to enlarge or reduce the moral significance of something". Another example is referring to manual labour as a "workout". Perhaps the most familiar usage today comes from the software world: "It's not a bug; it's a feature!" (This is used both euphemistically and literally, as many features in software originated as bugs).

Usage to describe a list

In studies on classical antiquity, it has come to mean the repetition of disjunctive words in a list.

In biblical studies, paradiastole is a type of anaphora (the repetition of one word at the beginning of successive sentences). Paradiastole uses certain words—either, or, neither, not, and nor—as disjunctions. A disjunction differs from a conjunction in that it separates things, whereas a conjunction joins them.

An example of this technique can be found in the Gospel of John, clarifying the meaning of τέκνα θεοῦ (God's children):

οἳ [πιστεύοντες]
οὐκ ἐξ αἱμάτων
οὐδὲ ἐκ θελήματος σαρκὸς
οὐδὲ ἐκ θελήματος ἀνδρὸς
ἀλλ' ἐκ θεοῦ ἐγεννήθησαν. (John 1.13).

They [the believers],
not of blood,
nor of the flesh's desire,
nor of a man's desire,
but of God were born.

In this passage, οὐκ and οὐδὲ (here translated not and nor) function as the disjunctions. The paradiastole emphasizes that those who believed (οἳ πιστεύοντες) and became "God's children" were not
physically ("of blood", etc.) born again, but divinely.

The French Enlightenment writer Voltaire remarked sardonically:  "This agglomeration which was called and which still calls itself the Holy Roman Empire was neither holy, nor Roman, nor an empire."

See also
Litotes
Meiosis (figure of speech)

References

Cuddon, J.A., ed. The Penguin Dictionary of Literary Terms and Literary Theory. 3rd ed. Penguin Books: New York, 1991.

Figures of speech
Rhetoric
Euphemisms